These are the results of the women's team competition in badminton at the 2011 Southeast Asian Games in Jakarta.

Medalists

Draw

Quarter-finals

Semifinal

Final

References

Badminton at the 2011 Southeast Asian Games
South